The Thaler was a coin issued by Baden of varying equivalents to its currency, the South German gulden, each of 60 kreuzer.
 From 1690 the Reichsthaler specie coin of 25.984 g fine silver was issued for 2 gulden.
 From 1754 the Conventionsthaler of 23.3856 g fine silver was issued for 2.4 gulden (2 gulden, 24 kreuzer).
 From the 19th century the Kronenthaler of 25.71 g fine silver was issued for 2.7 gulden (2 gulden, 42 kreuzer).
 From the 19th century the French silver écu  was accepted for 2.8 gulden (2 gulden, 48 kreuzer).
 From 1837, the doppelthaler worth two Prussian thalers was issued for 3 gulden. 
 From 1857 to 1871 the Vereinsthaler was issued for 1 gulden.

Grand Duchy of Baden
Currencies of Germany
Modern obsolete currencies